Seoul Grand Park is a park complex to the south of Seoul, South Korea, in the city of Gwacheon (과천시).

Facilities at Seoul Grand Park include hills and hiking trails, Seoul Grand Park Zoo, Children's Zoo, a rose garden, Seoul Land amusement park, and the Seoul Museum of Modern Art.

The attractions all have separate admission fees. Line 4 of the Seoul Metropolitan Subway stops at Seoul Grand Park Station. A shuttle bus from the station visits the art museum and upper park entrance.

The Seoul Zoo has more than 3,000 animals from 330 species.

Facilities

Seoul Grand Park Zoo
Seoul Grand Park Zoo, first zoo in the Korean peninsula, was created in 1909 by the Japanese in the former royal palace of Changgyeongung, which was under the changed name of Changgyeongweon. The zoo opened in November 1909 with Siberian tigers, kangaroos, ostriches, camels, orangutans, and other animals.

Towards the end of World War II the Japanese needed both manpower and steel for weapons, and gave orders to kill the animals in the zoo, poisoning 150 animals. Animals that survived this had to also survive the end of the war, when all the remaining zookeepers fled the zoo. The zoo was maintained by the South Korean government at Changgyeongweon until 1984 when it was relocated to its current site in Makgyedong, Gwacheon.

Seoul Land 
Seoul Land is an amusement park in the Seoul Grand park complex. It opened in 1987, just before the 1988 Summer Olympics. It has about 40 rides and has approximately 3-3.5 million visitors per year.

National Museum of Modern and Contemporary Art 
The National Museum of Contemporary Art (MMCA), also known as Gwacheon Contemporary Art Museum, is located in Gwacheon, South Korea. The museum was initially established in Gyeongbokgung on October 20, 1969, but was moved to Deoksugung in 1973. The Gwacheon venue opened in 1986. In recent years, MMCA's has undergone changes to become more family-friendly.

Gallery

Notes

External links

Seoul Grand Park - Seoul City Official Tourism
Website of the Korean Association of Zoos & Aquaria

Parks in Gyeonggi Province
Zoos in South Korea
Botanical gardens in South Korea